"Pop Is Dead" is a song by the English rock band Radiohead. It was released as a non-album single on 10 May 1993, several months after their debut album, Pablo Honey. It reached number 42 on the UK Singles Chart. It was included in the 2009 Pablo Honey reissue.

Music
"Pop Is Dead" is driven by a chromatic riff played by the lead guitarist, Jonny Greenwood. As with Radiohead's previous single, "Anyone Can Play Guitar", the lyrics criticise the media and music industry.

The B-side, the acoustic track "Banana Co.", was described as "a mildly Beatlesque tune" with lyrics that hinted at a general loathing of multinational corporations. The electric version of the track was later included on the "Street Spirit (Fade Out)" single. The live version of the "Ripcord" from the B-side was recorded at a Town and Country Club gig in London in February 1993, when Radiohead opened for Belly. This version contains extra lyrics, added after the second chorus: "They can kiss my ass!"

Reception
"Pop Is Dead" reached number 42 on the UK Singles Chart, below expectations. It was not released in the US. Following the release of Radiohead's second album, The Bends, in 1995, the Melody Maker editor Robin Bresnark wrote: "If they came out with ["Pop is Dead"] now, it would be a top five single." Five years after its release, the Radiohead guitarist Ed O'Brien called the track "a hideous mistake". The drummer, Phil Selway, said that he regretted releasing it.

Reviewing the 2009 Pablo Honey reissue, the IGN critic Finn White described "Pop is Dead" as a "clever and humorous rock satire". However, Pitchfork's Scott Plagenhoef found it "dreadful". In 2019, theVulture critic Marc Hogan named it the worst Radiohead song.

Music video

The music video was directed by Dwight Clarke, based on a treatment by singer Thom Yorke. It features Yorke portraying the character of Pop as "a dandified vampire in a glass coffin", accompanied by other band members. According to Clarke, "We had the entire Radiohead fan club carrying him across the Oxford Downs  ... In the early '90s, we probably thought those videos were all right, but looking back at them now, we all just want to die." Stereogum likened the video to those of Nirvana.

Track listing
 "Pop Is Dead" – 2:13
 "Banana Co." (acoustic) – 2:27
 "Creep" (live) – 4:11
 "Ripcord" (live) – 3:08

Personnel
Radiohead
 Thom Yorke – vocals, guitar
 Jonny Greenwood – guitar, piano
 Colin Greenwood – bass guitar
 Ed O'Brien – guitar, backing vocals
Philip Selway – drums

Technical personnel
 Jim Warren – production
 Radiohead – production
 Barry Hammond – mixing
 Rachel Owen – artwork
 Icon – design

Chart performance

References

Parlophone singles
Pop is Dead
1993 singles
EMI Records singles
Songs written by Thom Yorke
Songs written by Colin Greenwood
Songs written by Jonny Greenwood
Songs written by Philip Selway
Songs written by Ed O'Brien
Satirical songs
Songs about pop music
Songs about the media
Songs about radio
1993 songs